The Central Connecticut Blue Devils are composed of 16 teams representing Central Connecticut State University in intercollegiate athletics, including men and women's basketball, cross country, golf, soccer, and track and field. Men's sports include baseball and football. Women's sports include volleyball, lacrosse, swimming & diving, and softball. The Blue Devils compete in the NCAA Division I Football Championship Subdivision (FCS) and are members of the Northeast Conference.

Teams

Facilities

Notable alumni

Baseball

 Ricky Bottalico – pitcher, Philadelphia Phillies;  analyst, Comcast SportsNet Philadelphia
 John Hirschbeck – MLB umpire
 Alfred "Skip" Jutze – catcher, St. Louis Cardinals, Houston Astros, and Seattle Mariners
 Evan Scribner – Relief pitcher, San Diego Padres, Oakland Athletics and Seattle Mariners

Basketball
 Corsley Edwards – center and forward, New Orleans Hornets
 Keith Closs – center, Los Angeles Clippers

Football
 Steve Addazio – Assistant coaching positions: Syracuse, Indiana, Notre Dame, and Florida;   Head Coach: Temple University (2011-2012), Head Coach: Boston College (2013–2019), Head Coach: Colorado State (2020-present)
 Al Bagnoli – Head Coach, the University of Pennsylvania
 Dave Campo – Head Coach, the Dallas Cowboys; Defensive coach, Cleveland Browns, Jacksonville Jaguars, University of Kentucky
 Jake Dolegala – Quarterback, Cincinnati Bengals and New England Patriots
 Justise Hairston – New England Patriots, Buffalo Bills and Indianapolis Colts
 Scott Pioli – General Manager of the Kansas City Chiefs. 
 Mike Sherman – Head coach, Green Bay Packers and Texas A&M Aggies
 John Skladany – Defensive coordinator, Houston Cougars; special teams assistant, University of Central Florida Knights.

References

External links
 
 CCSU Central Connecticut State University Blue Devils Apparel